Elina Shirazi is a bilingual Iranian-American journalist and Miami-based correspondent for Fox News Channel.

Career

Shirazi began her career as a producer for Fox News and later worked as a reporter and anchor for WDVM-TV, a station covering Virginia, Maryland and the District of Columbia. She became one of the first Iranian-Americans to work for Fox News on-air when she was hired by the network in 2018 as a multimedia reporter based in Miami, where she covered the 2020 United States presidential election and Florida news, including the state's recovery from Hurricane Michael.

References

External links
 Fox News Profile
 Official Twitter
 Official Facebook

American television reporters and correspondents
American University alumni
American people of Iranian descent
American women television journalists
Living people
Fox News people
Journalists from Virginia
1994 births
21st-century American journalists
21st-century American women